Levangselva or Levangerelva is a river that flows through the area of Frol in the municipality of Levanger in Trøndelag county, Norway. It flows into the Trondheimsfjord in the town of Levanger.

The river has Atlantic salmon and trout.

See also
List of rivers in Norway

References

Levanger
Rivers of Trøndelag
Rivers of Norway